This is a list of films which placed number-one at the South Korean box office during 2011, based on admissions.

Highest-grossing films

See also 
 List of South Korean films of 2011

References 

2011 in South Korean cinema
2011
South Korea